Ernst Boerschmann (18 February 1873 – 30 April 1949) was a German architect, photographer, and sinologist known for his research on and photography of historical Chinese architecture. He was the first foreigner to systematically document China's religious architecture, compiling thousands of photographs, sketches, and architectural surveys over multiple trips to China in the first half of the twentieth century.

Biography

Ernst Boerschmann was born in Priekulė, Klaipėda Region, Lithuania, on 18 February 1873. His brother Friedrich Börschmann (1870–1841) was a physician, and his sister Anna Börschmann (1871–1939) was an educator.

As a child, Boerschmann attended the Humanistische Gymnasium in Memel. He entered the Technical University of Berlin in 1891, majoring in Architecture, where he graduated in 1896. After college, he joined the Staatsexamen and graduated in 1901 as an Assessor. From 1902 to 1904, he was an Engineer with the East Asian Occupation Brigade (Ostasiatischen Besatzungsbrigade) in China, where he became interested in classical Chinese architecture.

In 1906, Boerschmann began his first expedition with the financial support of the German Empire. He traveled to China as a scientific advisor to the German Foreign Office, who would continue to support his studies until the outbreak of World War I in 1914. On this trip he documented many Buddhist pagodas with cameras and drawings, which formed the material for his later publications.

In June 1912, the first major display of Boerschmann's photographic work was mounted at the Kunstgewerbemuseum Berlin.

After the First World War, Boerschmann was a lecturer on China in Königsberg (now Kaliningrad) from 1918 to 1921. He worked initially only in East Prussia, but was soon extended to the entire empire. Beginning in 1921 he worked in Berlin as a lecturer at the Technical University of Berlin, where he was named a Professor in 1927.

With the publication of three books of his photography of China in the 1920s – Baukunst und Landschaft (which was translated into French and English), Picturesque China, and Chinesische Architktur  – Boerschmann became internationally well known, but as a photographer rather than a researcher. 1923's Picturesque China, which boasted a print-run of 20,000 copies in German alone and was published in two English versions (in London and New York), was to become his most successful book.

In 1931, Chinese architectural expert Zhu Qiqian (朱啓鈐) invited Boerschmann to join his newly-founded Society for Research in Chinese Architecture in Beijing as a corresponding member. From 1933 to 1937, Boerschmann embarked on his third trip to China. On this trip, he collected many documents, oral history accounts, photographs, building plans, and inscriptions. He returned to Germany in 1940 and became a lecturer at the Humboldt University of Berlin on Chinese architecture. In 1943, his apartment was destroyed by WWII bombings.

In 1945, Boerschmann was promoted to Professor of Sinology at the Humboldt University of Berlin, and later held the same position at Hamburg University. He died in Bad Pyrmont, Hamelin-Pyrmont, Lower Saxony, on 30 April 1949.

Legacy

American rare book and photograph collector Stephan Loewentheil has amassed a notable archive of Boerschmann's work – one of the world's largest holdings of early Chinese architectural photographs. The Boerschmann holdings of the Stephan Loewentheil China Photography Collection include "thousands of photographs" (many of which were never published), texts, maps, illustrations, manuscripts, correspondences, and other objects.

Boerschmann's field observations in China, from meticulous architectural drawings to artful photographs, would set the standard for architectural historians of the region for decades to come. During his lifetime, Boerschmann was undoubtedly the leading expert on Chinese historical architecture in the German-speaking world, but the limitations of German as a language for research and publication made it difficult for international scholars to study his work in depth. In 2010, more than a century after his first trip to China, China Heritage Quarterly declared that Boerschmann "is gradually being recognized for his breadth of vision, the richness of the material he collected, and the serious intellectual underpinnings of his enterprise."

Works
 The Architecture and Religious Culture of the Chinese, 1914
 Picturesque China, 1923

References

Bibliography

 
 
 洛文希尔中国摄影收藏
 对中国建筑史有重要影响的德国摄影家：恩斯特·柏石曼《遗失的影像 早期德国来华摄影家

1873 births
1949 deaths
19th-century German architects
Photographers from Berlin
German sinologists
Technical University of Berlin alumni
Academic staff of the Humboldt University of Berlin
20th-century German architects
Architects from Berlin
Emigrants from the Russian Empire to the German Empire